ServiceSource Tower, also previously known as the SunTrust Building and the 4th and Church Building, is a high-rise office building in downtown Nashville, Tennessee.

History 

This building was built as the headquarters for Third National Corporation in 1968, and was designed by Brush, Hutchison, & Gwinn.  It was previously known as the Third National Bank Building, prior to the SunTrust acquisition of Third National Corporation, and eventual name change in 1995.

When it opened in 1967, ServiceSource Tower was the city’s second tallest building, trailing only the 409-foot, 30-story L&C Tower.  

The site at 4th & Church was also home to the historic Maxwell House Hotel from 1859 until it burned and was destroyed by fire on Christmas Day in 1961.

The building was updated with ServiceSource signage in July 2012.

Tenants 
The original tenant was Third National Corporation of Nashville, which became a subsidiary of SunTrust, who vacated the building to move to SunTrust Plaza.

Another intriguing previous tenant was the Signature Tower sales center and Giarratana Development offices.

J.P. Morgan Chase has also filed for a permit to open a branch here. 

A popular current tenant is the Nashville City Club located on the 20th floor.

See also 
List of tallest buildings in Nashville

References 

Skyscraper office buildings in Nashville, Tennessee
Office buildings completed in 1968